K. A. Shanmuga Mudaliar (2 November , 1885 - 17 July , 1978 ) is an Indian educationalist, freedom fighter, and politician. He was former Chairman and former Member of the Legislative Assembly from Tirupattur constituency as a Congress candidate. He worked for the development of education in the Gudiyatham area of Tirupattur. He donated 47 acres of land his oun land and Rupees 5 lakhs to set up the Government Thirumagal Mill's College.

He served as President of Sengunthar Mahajana Sangam for more than 20 years..

References 

Indian National Congress politicians from Tamil Nadu